"Still" is a song by Canadian recording artist Tamia. It was written and produced by Johntá Austin, Bryan Michael Cox, and Jermaine Dupri and produced Dupri and Cox for her third studio album More (2004). The song was released as the album's third single in October 2004. A re-recorded version of "Still" with new arrangement and production by Luke Laird was also released on Tamia's fifth studio Beautiful Surprise (2012).

Track listings

Notes
 denotes co-producer
 denotes additional producer

Credits and personnel
Credits adapted from the liner notes of More.

Johntá Austin – writer
Bryan Michael Cox – co-production, writer
Jermaine Dupri – production, writer
Tamia – vocals

Charts

References

2004 singles
Tamia songs
Songs written by Bryan-Michael Cox
Songs written by Jermaine Dupri
Song recordings produced by Jermaine Dupri
2004 songs
Elektra Records singles
Songs written by Johntá Austin
Contemporary R&B ballads
2000s ballads